The 2002 Philippine Basketball Association (PBA) rookie draft was an event at which teams drafted players from the amateur ranks. It was held on January 13, 2002, at the Glorietta Activity Center in Makati City.

Round 1

Round 2

Round 3

Round 4

Round 5

Round 6

Round 7

Note
*All players are Filipinos until proven otherwise.

References

Philippine Basketball Association draft
draft